David Wells (born 1963) is an American former baseball pitcher.

David Wells may also refer to:

David Ames Wells (1828–1898), American economist
David F. Wells (born 1939), professor of theology, Congregational minister, author
David H. Wells, photographer and video maker
David Wells (admiral) (1918–1983), Australian Deputy Chief of Naval Staff (1970–1971)
David Wells (American football), player in the National Football League
David Wells (medium) (born 1960), British astrologer and purported medium
David Wells (politician) (born 1962), Canadian senator from Newfoundland and Labrador
Dino Wells (David R. Wells Jr., born 1970), American actor

See also
David Wallace-Wells, climate change journalist